The FM- and TV-mast Olsztyn-Pieczewo (also known as Maszt RTCN Olsztyn-Pieczewo) is a  guyed mast for FM and TV situated at Olsztyn-Pieczewo in Poland

The FM- and TV-mast Olsztyn-Pieczewo, which was built in 1969, is since the collapse of the Warsaw radio mast, the second tallest structure in Poland.
It is called in honor of Stefan Kamiński, the initiator of TV in Olsztyn "Stefan".

Transmitted programmes

Digital Television MPEG-4

FM radio

See also
 List of masts

References

External links
 http://emi.emitel.pl/EMITEL/obiekty.aspx?obiekt=DODR_N2L
 http://radiopolska.pl/wykaz/pokaz_lokalizacja.php?pid=85
 http://www.dvbtmap.eu/mapcoverage.html?chid=5786
 
 http://skyscraperpage.com/diagrams/?b41592

Buildings and structures in Olsztyn
Radio masts and towers in Poland
Towers completed in 1969
1969 establishments in Poland